Manhattan Avenue may refer to:
 Manhattan Avenue (Brooklyn), in Williamsburg and Greenpoint, New York
 Manhattan Avenue (Manhattan), in Harlem and the Upper West Side, New York